Guðmundur Ívarsson Guðmundsson (17 July 1909 – 19 December 1987) was an Icelandic politician and former minister. He was the Minister of Finance of Iceland from 1958 to 1959. He was also a diplomat who served as ambassador to the United Kingdom (with concurrent accreditation in the Netherlands), to Spain and Portugal, to Nigeria (1971), to the United States (1971-1973 with concurrent accreditation in Canada, Mexico, Cuba, Brazil and Argentina), to Sweden (1973-1977 with concurrent accreditation in Finland and Austria) and to Belgium, Luxembourg, the European Union and NATO (1977-1979).

References 

1909 births
1987 deaths
Finance ministers of Iceland
Gudmundur Ivarsson Gudmundsson
Ambassadors of Iceland to Argentina
Ambassadors of Iceland to Austria
Ambassadors of Iceland to Belgium
Ambassadors of Iceland to Brazil
Ambassadors of Iceland to Canada
Ambassadors of Iceland to Cuba
Ambassadors of Iceland to Finland
Ambassadors of Iceland to Luxembourg
Ambassadors of Iceland to Mexico
Ambassadors of Iceland to Nigeria
Ambassadors of Iceland to the Netherlands
Ambassadors of Iceland to Portugal
Ambassadors of Iceland to Spain
Ambassadors of Iceland to Sweden
Ambassadors of Iceland to the United Kingdom
Ambassadors of Iceland to the United States
Ambassadors of Iceland to the European Union
Permanent Representatives of Iceland to NATO